Saret is a surname. Notable people with the surname include:

Alan Saret (born 1944), American sculptor, draftsman, and installation artist 
Jennifer Saret (born 1974), Filipino tennis player

See also
Saget